Materewadi is a village located in Maharashtra state, Nashik district and in Dindori taluka.

This village is only 30 km away from Nashik district. You can easily take bus from Old CBS in Nashik.

Materewadi is a religious place. People over here are theist. You will find various temples here of lord Hanumana, Khanderao, lord Rama, and Vithala and Rukmini. On every Tuesday few people come together and discuss mythological stories of gods Shree Krishna and Vishnu. There exists a group who follows values of Pandurang Shastri Athawale. Lot of rituals are performed by villagers. 
Many water sources are near by Materewadi like Palkhed Dam, Kadwa River which are very helpful to farmers.
There is one of the group of villagers in Materewadi famous as Hanuman Chowk. Members of the Hanuman Chowk are always ready to help needy people.

Sanitation and drainage:
Materewadi has good system of sanitation and drainage. Because filth and rubbish of the village should be regularly removed away into the compost pits. An ideal village has very good drains so that the dirty water of the village is properly drained away.

Dwelling-houses:

The dwelling-house in an Materewadi are very neat and clean. The dwellers of these houses look to the house sanitation and house-drainage. The houses have sufficient windows to let in light and air. All the houses are roofed by good tiles at least.

Food and fodder:
 
The Materewadi grow food for themselves and fodder for their cattle. They eat fresh and healthy food. They grow good grass for fodder and also leave sufficient land for pasture.

Drinking water:
Materewadi should have good supply of drinking water. There are enough tube-wells in an ideal village. There are separate ponds for men and cattle.

Agriculture and Industry: 
People of an Materewadi are good farmers and good artisans. They grow food crops, commercial crops and oil-seeds. They take up improved method of farming. They do all kinds of home-industry including spinning and weaving.

Educational facilities:
There are Primary schools, High schools and is Materewadi . Primary education is free and compulsory.

Clinical facilities:
In an ideal village, there are clinical facilities for men and the domestic animals. Hence, there are dispensaries and veterinary dispensaries.

Other facilities:
We can find post-office, public library, playground, gymnasium there.

Villages in Nashik district